Mesonia phycicola is a Gram-negative, aerobic and non-motile bacterium from the genus of Mesonia which has been isolated from  seaweed near Mara Island.

References

Flavobacteria
Bacteria described in 2010